Saaleck Castle is a hill castle near Bad Kösen, now a part of Naumburg, Saxony-Anhalt, Germany. 

In 1922, two of the men who had killed Walther Rathenau, the foreign minister of Germany, hid at Saaleck Castle but were tracked down by the police. The Nazi regime later put up a memorial plaque at the castle and turned their grave in Saaleck cemetery into a heroes' shrine. 

The castle is now mostly ruined, but its two towers feature small exhibits and it is a popular tourist attraction. Saaleck Castle is a stop on the designated tourist route Straße der Romanik ("Romanesque Road").

Geography
Saaleck Castle is located in the village of Saaleck in the district of Burgenlandkreis in the German state of Saxony-Anhalt. It overlooks the Saale river and is only a few hundred metres from another castle, the Rudelsburg. Since 2010, Bad Kösen and with it Saaleck Castle has been part of the municipality of Naumburg.

History
In 1922, two of the assassins of German foreign minister Walther Rathenau were spotted at the castle, whose owner was himself a secret member of the Organisation Consul. On 17 July they were confronted by two police detectives. While waiting for reinforcements during the stand-off one of the detectives fired at a window, unknowingly killing Erwin Kern with a bullet in the head. Hermann Willibald Fischer then took his own life. The Nazis erected a memorial plate to them at the castle in July 1933.

Under East Germany’s communist regime, the complex served as a residential care home for the elderly. From 1995 until 2019, it was not used.

The Marzona Foundation acquired the property in 2018 and the German government has approved a grant of 7 million euros towards the site’s renovation. The Design Academy Saaleck plans to offer six-month stipends to work on individual and joint projects with a special focus on climate, sustainability and new technologies to 16 emerging designers, craftspeople or architects from around the world each year.

Description 
The castle lies on a roof-shaped, west-facing muschelkalk ridge immediately south of the village of Saaleck, at a height of about 172 metres above sea level and is just under 23 metres high. The characteristic picture of the castle is dominated by its two bergfrieds, which have wall thicknesses of about 2 metres and are visible from a long way off. In the masonry of the west tower is a medieval garderobe and a stove that indicate where the residential level was. The centre of the castle was once surrounded by inner and outer defensive walls. By the inner wall are the remains of several domestic buildings. On the two narrow sides of the surrounding terrace were moats with ramparts in front of it. On the east side of the hill spur facing Rudelsburg there are more neck ditches, again guarded by ramparts.

Comparable castles with two round bergfrieds are Münzenberg, Hohandlau, Botenlaube and Thurant.

Gallery

References

Further reading
History and construction:
 Hansjürgen Brachmann: G 17 Bad Kösen, Kr. Naumburg (Bez. Halle). In: Joachim Herrmann (ed.): Archäologie in der Deutschen Demokratischen Republik. Denkmale und Funde, Urania-Verlag, Leipzig, 1989, ; Licensed production by Theiss-Verlag, Stuttgart 1989, pp. 815 ff.
 Reinhard Schmitt: Zum Stand der Bergfriedforschung in Saxony-Anhalt. In: Burgenforschung aus Saxony 3/4, 1994, pp. 143–178.
 Reinhard Schmitt: Bad Kösen. Rudelsburg, Saaleck, Romanisches Haus (Große Baudenkmäler Heft 457)- 3rd edition, Munich/Berlin 1996, pp. 2–15.
 Reinhard Schmitt: Burgen des hohen Mittelalters an der unteren Unstrut und um Naumburg. Zum Stand der Forschung. In: Burgen um Freyburg und Naumburg. Burgen und Schlösser in Saxony-Anhalt Sonderheft. Halle/Saale 1996, pp. 6–48, especially pp. 18 ff.
 Reinhard Schmitt: Burg Saaleck, Burgenlandkreis. Zur Geschichte und Baugeschichte. In: Burgen und Schlösser in Saxony-Anhalt Vol. 15, 2006, pp. 6–56.
 Gerd Strickhausen: Burgen der Ludowinger in Thüringen, Hessen und dem Rheinland: Studien zu Architektur und Landesherrschaft im Hochmittelalter. (Quellen und Forschungen zur hessischen Geschichte Vol. 109.) Darmstadt [etc.]: self-publication by the Hessische Historische Kommission, Darmstadt etc., 1998, pp. 238 ff. (Strickhausen takes the view that the castle was not built until 1225 which is too late based on the surviving structure, c.f. R. Schmitt).

On the history of the 19th and 20th centuries:
 Kai Agthe: "Und ein Lied streicht durch die Hallen …". Burgen-Romantik am Beispiel von Rudelsburg und Saaleck. In: Palmbaum. Literarisches Journal aus Thüringen Vol. 10 Issue 2, 2002, pp. 7–14.
 Rüdiger Haufe: "Die Geister der Burg Saaleck". Der "Burgherr" Hans Wilhelm Stein im Schnittpunkt von völkischer Bewegung und Heimatbewegung. In: Rudelsburg – Saaleck – Kyffhäuser. Protokollband der wissenschaftlichen Tagungen 14 - 16 June 2002 in Bad Kösen and 13 - 15 June 2003 in Bad Frankenhausen (Deutsche Erinnerungslandschaften 1st entries of Regional- und Landeskultur Saxony-Anhalts 32). Landesheimatbund Saxony-Anhalt e.V., Halle/Saale, 2004, pp. 50–72.
 Jürgen John: Zeitgeschichte und Erinnerungskultur. Grandaspekte und ein Fallbeispiel: die Erinnerungslandschaft Rudelsburg-Saaleck. In: Ramona Myrrhe (Hrsg.): Geschichte als Beruf. Demokratie und Diktatur, Protestantismus und politische Kultur (Celebratory article on the 65th birthday of Klaus Erich Pollmann). Stekovics, Halle/Saale, 2005, pp. 121–138.
 Rüdiger Kutz: Die Rudelsburg als Symbolort der Kösener Corpsstudenten. In: Rudelsburg – Saaleck – Kyffhäuser. Protokollband der wissenschaftlichen Tagungen 14 - 16 June 2002 in Bad Kösen and 13 - 15 June 2003 in Bad Frankenhausen (Deutsche Erinnerungslandschaften 1st entries of the Regional- und Landeskultur Saxony-Anhalts 32). Landesheimatbund Saxony-Anhalt e.V., Halle/Saale, 2004, pp. 103–125.

External links 

 Website run by the local association, Heimatverein Saaleck e.V. (German)
 Artist's impression of the reconstructed castle
 Romanesque Road website (German)
 Page at Transromanica.com (German(
 

Castles in Saxony-Anhalt
Buildings and structures in Burgenlandkreis
Romanesque Road